This article contains the discography of American R&B singer, Shanice. This includes studio albums, compilation albums, and singles.

Albums

Studio albums

Compilation albums

Singles

As lead artist

As featured artist

 Not released for sale in the US/Radio-only single in America (before download sales).

Other appearances

Album appearances

Soundtrack appearances

Music videos
 "(Baby Tell Me) Can You Dance" (1987)
 "No 1/2 Steppin" (1987)
 "I'll Bet She's Got a Boyfriend" (1988)
 Kiara featuring Shanice: "This Time" (1988)
 "I Love Your Smile" (1991)
 "I'm Cryin" (1992)
 "Saving Forever for You" (1992)
 "It's for You" (1993)
 "Somewhere" (1994)
 "Turn Down the Lights" (1994)
 "I Wish" (1994)
 "I Like" (1994)
 Jon Secada & Shanice: "If I Never Knew You" (1995)
 "When I Close My Eyes" (1999)
 "Yesterday" (Unreleased) (1999)
 "You Need a Man" (1999)
 "Every Woman Dreams" (2005)
 "Take Care of U" (2006)
 Jeremiah featuring Shanice: "Chasing Forever" (2006)
 "Gotta Blame Me" (2014)

References

Discographies of American artists
Rhythm and blues discographies